Éliane Assassi (born 2 October 1958) is a French politician and a member of the Senate of France, representing the Seine-Saint-Denis department. She is a member of the Communist, Republican, Citizen and Ecologist group.

See also 
 Women in the French Senate

References

1958 births
Living people
French Senators of the Fifth Republic
Women members of the Senate (France)
21st-century French women politicians
Senators of Seine-Saint-Denis
Politicians from Paris
French people of Algerian descent